Ahmed Al-Shehri (born 4 September 1993) is a Saudi footballer who plays as a midfielder.

External links
 

1993 births
Living people
Saudi Arabian footballers
Association football midfielders
Ettifaq FC players
Saudi Professional League players
Saudi First Division League players
Saudi Arabia youth international footballers
Footballers at the 2014 Asian Games
Asian Games competitors for Saudi Arabia
20th-century Saudi Arabian people
21st-century Saudi Arabian people